George Holroyd may refer to:

 George Sowley Holroyd (1758–1831), English lawyer and justice
 George Holroyd, 2nd Earl of Sheffield (1802–1876), British politician